Compsocidae is a family of Psocodea (formerly Psocoptera) belonging to the suborder Troctomorpha. The family comprises two extant species in two genera, both found in Mesoamerica. Compsocus elegans is found in Mexico and Central America, while Electrentomopsis variegata is found in Mexico.  The antennae of each species have 13 or 14 segments. Two extinct genera, Burmacompsocus and Paraelectrentomopsis are known from the Cenomanian aged Burmese amber of Myanmar.

Taxonomy 

 Compsocus Banks, N., 1930
 Compsocus elegans Banks, N., 1930
 Electrentomopsis Mockford, 1967
 Electrentomopsis variegata Mockford, 1967
 †Burmacompsocus Nel & Waller, 2007
Burmacompsocus banksi (Cockerell, 1916) (originally Psyllipsocus)
Burmacompsocus coniugans Sroka & Nel, 2017
Burmacompsocus perreaui Nel & Waller, 2007
Burmacompsocus pouilloni Ngô-Muller et al. 2020
 †Paraelectrentomopsis Azar, Hakim & Huang, 2016
 Paraelectrentomopsis chenyangcaii Azar, Hakim & Huang, 2016

References

Sources 
Lienhard, C. & Smithers, C. N. 2002. Psocoptera (Insecta): World Catalogue and Bibliography. Instrumenta Biodiversitatis, vol. 5. Muséum d'histoire naturelle, Genève.

Psocoptera families
Troctomorpha